Bangkok Gay and Lesbian Film Festival (BGLFF) is an annual LGBT film festival held in Bangkok, Thailand.

History 
BGLFF was established by the staff of 'Attitude Magazine', an LGBT weekly publication in Bangkok, in 2015. The magazine, which began publishing in 2011, is the first in Thailand to specifically address the interests of the country's LGBT community, and to seek to represent LGBT views in wider Thai society.

The 2015 Festival lasted for 10 days, with 15 films from 12 countries, including Vietnam, Indonesia, the Philippines, China, South Korea, the United States and Europe. The first film to open the first Festival in 2015 was "How To Win At Checkers (Every Time)", a film about two brothers, one gay, set around a military draft day in Thailand.

See also
 List of LGBT film festivals

References

2015 establishments in Thailand
Annual events in Thailand
Film festivals in Thailand
LGBT events in Thailand
LGBT festivals in Asia
LGBT film festivals
Film festivals established in 2015
Tourist attractions in Bangkok